= Harry J. Psomiades =

Greek-American academic (1928–2011)

Harry J. Psomiades (1928–2011) was an American political scientist, professor and academic administrator at Queens College and the Graduate School of the University of New York. He taught there from 1965 to 2004. He was also the founder and director of the Center for Byzantine and Modern Greek Studies of Queens College from 1974 to 2004. He was the co-founder and co-editor of the Journal of Modern Hellenism. He was associate Dean of the Graduate School of International Affairs at Columbia University from 1959 to 1965.

The Dr. Harry J. Psomiades Library at The Asia Minor and Pontos Hellenic Research Center is named for him.

The Queens College Greek Center for Byzantine and Modern Greek Studies library collection is named after Dr. Harry J. Psomiades.

== Biography ==
Psomiades was born in Boston on September 8, 1928 to Pontic Greek parents who immigrated to the United States in the early nineteen hundreds. He was educated at the Boston Latin School and Boston University. He continued his studies at Columbia University where he earned his PhD in Public Law and Government.

For his work on the promotion of Greek Letters, Psomiades was awarded an honorary Doctor of Letters Degree by Hellenic College/Holy Cross Orthodox Seminary in 1985. He was a graduate of the U.S. Army War College, and a retired U.S. Army Reserve Colonel. He was decorated with the Legion of Merit and the Army Meritorious Service Medal Psomiades died on August 13, 2011, at the age of 82. His authorship and research covered many areas which included Greek politics, the Cyprus issue, Greek -Turkish relations, the Ecumenical Patriarchate, and the Greek American community.

== Selected publications ==
- The Eastern Question: The Last Phase. New York: Pella Publishing Co. 2000.
- Fridtjof Nansen and the Greek Refugee Crisis, 1922-1924, A Study in Greek -Turkish Diplomacy. New York: Pella Publishing Co. 2011.
- The Ecumenical Patriarchate in Captivity: Problems and Prospects. Nights of St. Andrew. 1978.
- The Phantom Republic of Pontus and the Megali Catastrophe. Melbourne, Australia: Hellenic Studies Forum. 1992.
- Political Elites and the process of Modernization. Stanford CN: Stanford University Press. 1969.
